The 2023 Copa Verde is the 10th edition of the football competition held in Brazil. Featuring 24 clubs, Acre, Amazonas, Distrito Federal, Espírito Santo, Mato Grosso, Pará and Tocantins have two vacancies; Amapá, Goiás, Mato Grosso do Sul, Rondônia and Roraima with one each. The others five berths was set according to CBF ranking.

The champion will have a spot in the third round of the 2024 Copa do Brasil.

Qualified teams

Schedule
The schedule of the competition is as follows.

First round

Draw

In the first round, each tie was played on a single-legged basis. The higher-ranked team hosted the match.  If the score was level, the match would go straight to the penalty shoot-out to determine the winner.

|}

Round of 16

In the round of 16, each tie was played on a single-legged basis. The higher-ranked team hosted the match.  If the score was level, the match would go straight to the penalty shoot-out to determine the winner.

|}

Bracket
From the quarter-finals, each tie was played on a home-and-away two-legged basis. The higher-ranked team hosted the second match. If the aggregate score was level, the second-leg match would go straight to the penalty shoot-out to determine the winners.

References

Copa Verde
Copa Verde
Copa Verde